Richard Beez (27 May 1827 – 28 March 1902) was a German mathematician who proved Beez's theorem.

He studied at the University of Leipzig where in 1850 he obtained a Ph.D. Later, Beez was a Gymnasium teacher in Plauen.

Notes

References

External links

1827 births
1902 deaths
19th-century German mathematicians